Wachenbuchen is the smallest district in the city of Maintal, Hesse, Germany. It is about 17 km east of Frankfurt am Main.

References

Further reading
Peter Heckert: Liebenswertes Wachenbuchen. Hanau 1997.
Heinrich Reimer: Historisches Ortslexikon für Kurhessen. Veröffentlichungen der Historischen Kommission für Hessen 14, 1926 pp. 73 f.
Eugen Heinz Sauer: Büchertalgeschichten. Festbuch zur 1200-Jahr-Feier der Stadtteile Hanau-Mittelbuchen und Maintal-Wachenbuchen. Hanau-Mittelbuchen 1997

External links
Wachenbuchen Online
Hessische Bibliographie: literature on Wachenbuchen
Maintal municipal website
Landesgeschichtliches Informationssystem Hessen (LAGIS): Wachenbuchen, Main-Kinzig-Kreis, in: Historisches Ortslexikon für Hessen

Main-Kinzig-Kreis